Iris foetidissima, the stinking iris, gladdon, Gladwin iris, roast-beef plant, or stinking gladwin, is a species of flowering plant in the family Iridaceae, found in open woodland, hedgebanks and on sea-cliffs.

Its natural range is Western Europe, including England (south of Durham) and also Ireland, and from France south and east to N. Africa, Italy and Greece. 

It is one of two iris species native to Britain, the other being the yellow iris (Iris pseudacorus).

It has tufts of dark green leaves. Its flowers are usually of a dull, leaden-blue colour, or dull buff-yellow tinged with blue. The petals have delicate veining. It blooms between June and July, but the flowers only last a day or so.

It is known as "stinking" because some people find the smell of its leaves unpleasant when crushed or bruised, an odour that has been described as "beefy". Its common names of 'gladdon' and 'gladwyn' or 'gladwin', are in reference to an old word for a sword, (Latin 'gladius') due to the shape of the irises leaves.

This plant is cultivated in gardens in the temperate zones. Both the species and its cultivar 'Variegata' have gained the Royal Horticultural Society's Award of Garden Merit.

Notes and references

foetidissima
Flora of Europe
Plants described in 1753
Taxa named by Carl Linnaeus